Sus is a 2010 British drama film directed by Robert Heath and starring Ralph Brown, Clint Dyer and Rafe Spall. It is set in a police station on the evening of the 1979 general election, where a black suspect is brought in and interrogated on suspicion of murder. It was written by Barrie Keeffe, adapted from his 1979 play with the same title, and takes its name from the sus law in operation at the time.

Cast 
 Ralph Brown - Karn
 Clint Dyer - Delroy
 Anjela Lauren Smith - Georgina
 Rafe Spall - Wilby

Critical reception
Time Out wrote "overall this is a well structured, emotionally rigorous piece of filmmaking, and a timely reminder of the dangers of unchecked police power."

References

External links
 
 This is London Magazine

2010 films
British drama films
Black British films
2010 drama films
Films shot at Elstree Film Studios
Films set in 1979
2010s English-language films
2010s British films